Oh Yun-kyo (May 25, 1960 – September 27, 2000) was a South Korean retired footballer. He appeared on the South Korea national football team at the 1986 FIFA World Cup.

Honours
Hanyang University
Korean National Championship runner-up: 1980

Hyundai Horang-i
Korean National Championship runner-up: 1989

Individual
K League 1 Best Goalkeeper: 1984, 1988
K League 1 Best XI: 1984, 1988

References

External links
 
 
 
 Oh Yun-kyo at KFA

1960 births
South Korean footballers
South Korea international footballers
Jeju United FC players
Ulsan Hyundai FC players
1986 FIFA World Cup players
2000 deaths
Association football goalkeepers
People from Seosan